HMS Supreme was a S-class submarine of the third batch built for the Royal Navy during World War II. She survived the war and was sold for scrap in 1950.

Design and description
The last 17 boats of the third batch were significantly modified from the earlier boats. They had a stronger hull, carried more fuel and their armament was revised. They displaced  on the surface and  submerged. The S-class submarines had a crew of 48 officers and ratings.

For surface running, the boats were powered by two  diesel engines, each driving one propeller shaft. When submerged each propeller was driven by a  electric motor. They could reach  on the surface and  underwater.

Supreme was armed with six 21 inch (533 mm) torpedo tubes in the bow. She carried six reload torpedoes for a grand total of a dozen torpedoes. Twelve mines could be carried in lieu of the torpedoes. The boat was also equipped with a 4-inch (102 mm) deck gun.

Construction and career
HMS Supreme was built by Cammell Laird and launched on 24 February 1944. So far she has been the only ship of the Royal Navy to bear the name Supreme. She survived the Second World War, spending most of it in the Pacific Far East, where she sank thirteen Japanese sailing vessels, six Japanese coasters, a Japanese tug and a barge, and a small unidentified Japanese vessel.  Supreme also attacked what is thought to be a Japanese auxiliary patrol vessel. Supreme was eventually paid off and broken up at Troon in July 1950.

Notes

References
 
  
 
 
 

 

British S-class submarines (1931)
1944 ships
Ships built on the River Mersey
World War II submarines of the United Kingdom
Royal Navy ship names